Du Yulu (January 1, 1941 – February 21, 2020) was a Chinese actor best known for portraying historical figures in several films and television series.

Biography
Du graduated from the Harbin Arts Academy. During the Cultural Revolution, Du worked as a manual labourer at a grain storage. His first major work was in the film Jianxi, released in 1978. In 1997, he portrayed Zhang Tingyu in the popular prime time historical television series Yongzheng Dynasty, vastly increasing his profile. In 2000, he acted as an elderly military officer in the television series Escaping encirclement, and also portrayed the head of the household in the hit television series Da Zhai Men. In 2002, he appeared as a provincial party chief in Provincial Party Secretary. In 2007, he portrayed Chiang Kai-shek in the series Red Sun, and reprised this role in the historical drama The East is Red.

Du died of lung cancer in Harbin, Heilongjiang, on February 21, 2020.

Personal life
Du was married to Zhu Yongyu, and they have a son named Du Gang, who was coach to Chinese table tennis legend Kong Linghui.

References

1941 births
2020 deaths
20th-century Chinese male actors
21st-century Chinese male actors
Chinese male film actors
Chinese male television actors
Male actors from Harbin
Deaths from lung cancer
Deaths from cancer in the People's Republic of China